Ivana Hadži-Popović (Serbian-Cyrillic: Ивана Хаџи-Поповић ; born 1951 in Belgrade, Yugoslavia) is a Serbian writer and translator.

Biography
Ivana Hadži-Popović studied at the Department of Romance Studies of Belgrade's Faculty of Philology and graduated with magister degree. She works as literary editor and translator at the Albatros publishing house in Belgrade.

Among her numerous translations are works of French and Italian writers such as Catherine Clément, Sidonie-Gabrielle Colette, Catherine Cusset, Anaïs Nin, Marguerite Yourcenar, Pierre Assouline, Dino Buzzati, Benoît Duteurtre, Pierre Michon, Henry de Montherlant, Antonio Tabucchi, Michel Tournier and Maryam Madjidi. The long-term translation and editorial activity is a noteworthy contribution to the Franco-Serbian cultural exchange.

Hadži-Popović's translation of the French-language memories, aphorisms and letters of Queen Natalie is a particularly interesting publication on the cultural and political history of Serbia. The author of nine novels, she is member of the International Francophone Press Union. She lives in Vračar.

Awards
 Isidora Sekulić Award

Bibliography (selection)
Sezona trešanja (Cherry Season), KOV, Vršac 1998, novel. 
Knez (Knez), KOV, Vršac 1999, novel.
Brod za Buenos Ajres (A Ship to Buenos Aires), Jugoslovenska knjiga, Belgrade 2001, novel, 
Zamka (The Trap), Filip Višnjić Publishing, Belgrade 2004, novel, .
Na Hadrijanovom tragu (On Hadrian's Trace), Filip Višnjić Publishing, Belgrade 2008, novel,  
Japanska kutija (The Japanese Box), Palabra, Belgrade 2010, novel, .
Žena s buketom (A Woman with Bouquet), Medijska knjižara Krug, Belgrade 2012, novel, . 
Vatra i cvet (Fire and Flower), Medijska knjižara Krug, Belgrade 2014, novel, .
Ljubičice Leonarda da Vinčija (Leonardo da Vinci’s Violas), Albatros plus, Belgrade 2017, novel,  .

References

1951 births
Living people
Serbian translators
Literary translators
Translators to Serbian
Translators from French
Serbian women writers
Writers from Belgrade
University of Belgrade alumni